Siete Foods is a US company founded in 2014 by Veronica Garza that makes nontraditional versions of traditional Mexican and Mexican-American ingredients and foods. According to Inc., the company "created a category in grain-free and dairy-free Mexican American staples".

History 
The company was founded in Austin, Texas, in 2014 by Veronica Garza, who was diagnosed with autoimmune diseases while in high school and college. Her brother Roberto suggested she try avoiding grains, legumes, and dairy to see if that would help with her symptoms. She found that it did, and her entire family joined her in excluding these items, but all of these were common ingredients in Mexican, Mexican-American, and Tex-Mex cuisines that were a part of the family's typical meals. In particular tortillas, typically included in every meal in these cuisines, were missed.   

Garza developed some recipes to create traditional items such as tortillas from nontraditional ingredients, such as almond flour, and started selling them from her home; eventually she was making 50 dozen tortillas in a weekend with the help of her family. In 2014 Austin's Wheatsville Food Co-op started carrying her products. By 2016 the products were being carried by Whole Foods. According to Inc., the company "created a category in grain-free and dairy-free Mexican American staples". 

Garza's parents and her four siblings are employees; the company's name, Siete, is the Spanish word for seven, a reference to the seven of them. In 2017, CEO Miguel Garza was named to Forbes' 30 under 30 list.

By 2022 the company was projected to have retail sales of US$250 million and was the fastest-growing Latino/Hispanic food brand in the United States. Forbes pointed out in 2018 that it had been decades since the category had a "challenger [brand] emerge", noting that Ortega was founded in 1897, Old El Paso in 1917, and Goya in 1936.

Products 
Products as of 2022 include tortillas, refried beans, tortilla chips, hard taco shells, cookies, seasoning mixes, and hot sauces in 60 stock-keeping units. In 2022 they also produced their first product containing corn, a tortilla chip in collaboration with Nixta, who are dedicated to traditional maize-based products and nixtamilization methods. 

The company produced a cookbook, The Siete Table: Nourishing Mexican-American Recipes From Our Kitchen, in 2022.

Juntos fund 
The company operates a foundation that provides grants to small Latino/Hispanic food entrepreneurs.

References 

2014 establishments in Texas
Food and drink companies established in the 2010s
Food product brands
Food manufacturers of the United States
Hispanic and Latino American cuisine
Latin American cuisine